This is a list of Italian television related events from 1984.

Events 

 2 February: a union protest of the Cornigliano metalworkers troubles the opening night of the Sanremo Festival. The host Pippo Baudo allows some activists to go on the stage and to read a press release. The next evening, during the performance of the band Queen as guest stars, Freddie Mercury sings designedly with the phone far from his mouth, revealing the playback. The contest is won by Albano and Romina with Ci sarà.

Shows of the year

Rai

Drama 

 Kaos – by Paolo and Vittorio Taviani, from the Sicilian tales of Luigi Pirandello, distributed also in a theatrical version; last role together for Franco and Ciccio.
 Notti e nebbie (Nights and fogs) – by Marco Tullio Giordana, from the Carlo Castellaneta’s novel, with Umberto Orsini and Eleonora Giorgi; in 2 parts. It’s the tragic story, set in the Milan of 1944, of a RSI police officer, fanatic fascist and cruel persecutor of the partisans, but not entirely devoid of remorses and humanity.  
 Western di cose nostre  - by Pino Passalaqua, from a Leonardo Sciascia’s tale, script by Andrea Camilleri, with Domenico Modugno; in 2 parts. In 1916, an unsuspected apothecary carries on a personal revenge, putting two mafia gangs against each other.

Miniseries 

 Cuore (Heart) – by Luigi Comencini, from the Edmondo De Amicis’ novel, script by Suso Cecchi D’Amico, with Johnny Dorelli, Giuliana De Sio, Eduardo De Filippo (in his last role) and the ten years old Carlo Calenda (grandson of the director and future politician) as protagonist; in 6 episodes. Comencini gives a very personal version of the book, criticizing its sentimentalism and nationalism and adding a frame story, where the little students, grown up, have to face the tragedy of the First World War.
 La piovra (The octopus) – by Damiano Damiani, script by Ennio De Concini, with Michele Placido, Barbara De Rossi, Florinda Bolkan and Flavio Bucci; 6 episodes. The superintendent Corrado Cattani, enquiring about the killing of a colleague and the drug traffic, has to fight against the omnipotent Sicilian mafia. The series, an effective mix of spectacle and civil engagement, gets an extraordinary public success, both in Italy (with 15 million viewers) and abroad, and has nine follow-ups.
La bella Otero – by Josè Maria Sanchez, with Angela Molina in the title role, Mismy Farmer and Harvey Keitel; 4 episodes.

Serials 

 I racconti del maresciallo (The marechal's tales) – by Giovanni Soldati, from the stories of his father Mario; follow-up of the 1968 serial, with Arnoldo Foà in the role once of Turi Ferro.
 Sherlok Hound (cartoon) –Italian-Japanese coproduction, realized in collaboration by Toni Pagot and Hayao Miyazaki.

News and educational 
Sheridan Indagine sui sentimenti (Sheridan investigation about sentiments) – enquiry, in form of detective story, about the sentiments in the modern society, from the various forms of  love to the sport and music passions. Final role for Ubaldo Lay who plays, for the last time, the Lieutenant Sheridan, become a private eye.
Effetto video 8 – Professione reporter (Video 8 effect- Profession reporter) magazine by Aldo Bruno and Milena Gabanelli. The program uses an innovative method for Italy; every episode is realized by a free-lance journalist, working alone with a portable video camera (Video 8).

References 

1984 in Italian television